{{Infobox airport
| name              = Charlotte Douglas International Airport
| image             = File:Charlotte Douglas International Airport logo.svg
| image-width       = 250
| image2            = CLT03FEB2012.png
| image2-width      = 250
| FAA               = CLT
| location          = 5501 Josh Birmingham ParkwayCharlotte, North Carolina, U.S.
| opened            = 
| hub               = American Airlines
| image_mapsize     = 200
| r1-length-f       = 8,677
| r1-surface        = Asphalt/concrete
| caption2          = Airport in 2012
| IATA              = CLT
| ICAO              = KCLT
| WMO               = 72314
| type              = Public
| owner-oper        = Charlotte Aviation Department
| city-served       = Charlotte metropolitan area
| elevation-f       = 748
| website           = 
| coordinates       = 
| image_map         = CLT Airport Diagram.svg
| image_map_caption = FAA airport diagram
| mapframe          = yes
| r1-number         = 18L/36R
| r2-number         = 18C/36C
| r2-length-f       = 10,000
| r2-surface        = Concrete
| r3-number         = 18R/36L
| r3-length-f       = 9,000
| r3-length-m       = 2,743
| r3-surface        = Concrete
| r4-number         = 05/23
| r4-length-f       = 7,502
| r4-length-m       = 2,287
| r4-surface        = Asphalt/concrete
| stat-year         = 2022
| stat1-header      = Passengers
| stat1-data        = 47,758,605 
| stat2-header      = Aircraft operations
| stat2-data        = 505,589
| footnotes         = Source: Charlotte Douglas International Airport<ref>

Charlotte Douglas International Airport (IATA: CLT, ICAO: KCLT, FAA LID: CLT), typically referred to as Charlotte Douglas, Douglas Airport, or simply CLT, is an international airport in Charlotte, North Carolina, located roughly six miles west of the city's central business district. Charlotte Douglas is the primary airport for commercial and military use in the Charlotte metropolitan area. Operated by the city of Charlotte's aviation department, the airport covers 5,558 acres (2,249 ha) of land.

Established in 1935 as Charlotte Municipal Airport, the airport was later renamed for Ben Elbert Douglas Sr., who was mayor of Charlotte when the airport was first built. In 1982 the airport was renamed again, this time to its current Charlotte Douglas International Airport.

In 2019, CLT was the 11th-busiest airport in the United States in terms of passenger traffic, having processed over 50 million passengers, and fifth-busiest in terms of aircraft operations, ranking sixth globally. In 2021, CLT grew to the sixth busiest airport in the United States. Charlotte is a fortress hub for American Airlines, which operates the majority of the airport's flights. The airport has four runways and one passenger terminal with 115 gates across five concourses. A commercial-civil-military facility, the airport is home to the Charlotte Air National Guard base and its host unit, the 145th Airlift Wing of the North Carolina Air National Guard.

History

Early years
The city received Works Progress Administration funding to establish Charlotte's first municipal airport; the airport was, at the time, the largest single WPA project in the United States, incorporating a terminal, hangar, beacon tower and three runways.

In 1936, Charlotte Municipal Airport opened, operated by the City of Charlotte; Eastern Air Lines began scheduled passenger service in 1937. The original passenger terminal still exists and is used for offices and training rooms by various aviation-related organizations.

The United States Army Air Forces took control of the airport and established Charlotte Air Base in early 1941, which was renamed Morris Field soon after the attack on Pearl Harbor. The US military invested more than $5 million in airfield improvements by the time the facility was returned to the City of Charlotte in 1946. The airfield was used by the Third Air Force for antisubmarine patrols and training.

1950 to mid-1960s: into the jet age
In 1954, a  passenger terminal opened and the airport was renamed Douglas Municipal Airport in honor of former Charlotte Mayor Ben Elbert Douglas Sr., who had overseen the airport's opening 20 years earlier. The terminal had two floors; passenger operations were confined to the ground floor. Ticketing and baggage claim were on each side of an open space that bisected the building north to south, and a mezzanine restaurant and airline offices overlooked this open space. Delta Air Lines began scheduled passenger service in 1956. The OAG for April 1957 shows 57 weekday departures on Eastern, 7 Piedmont, 6 Capital, 4 Delta and 2 Southern. Nonstop flights did not reach beyond Newark, Pittsburgh, Columbus, Louisville, Birmingham, and Jacksonville.

Scheduled jet flights (Eastern Air Lines Boeing 720s) began in early 1962. Eastern used the west pier, Piedmont and Delta the center pier, and United and Southern used the east pier.

Late 1960s to 1978: before deregulation
A major renovation project in the late 1960s expanded the facility. Eastern opened a unit terminal in 1967, replacing the old west pier. This new facility had eight dedicated gates for Eastern, each with its own departure lounge, snack bar and separate baggage claim space. Eastern passengers continued to check in at the main terminal.

In 1969, a new enclosed concourse was built parallel to the center pier. When it was completed, Piedmont, Eastern, and Delta moved in and the old center pier was demolished. The new concourse had separate departure lounges, restrooms and an enlarged baggage claim area. United's flights continued to use the east pier, with an enclosed holding room added for waiting passengers. Eastern added two more gates to the end of its west concourse in 1973.

In April 1975, the airport had 97 weekday departures to 32 destinations on seven airlines.

1978 to 1989: becoming a hub
After airline deregulation, passenger numbers at the terminal nearly doubled between 1978 and 1980, and a new  parallel runway and control tower opened in 1979. The airport's master plan called for a new terminal across the runway from the existing site, with ground broken in 1979. At the time, the airport had only two concourses: one used exclusively by Eastern, and one used by other carriers, including United, Delta, Piedmont, and several commuter airlines.

In 1979, Piedmont Airlines chose Charlotte as the hub for its expanding network. A new  passenger terminal designed by Odell Associates opened in 1982, and the airport was renamed Charlotte Douglas International Airport. Concourses B and C were expanded in 1987 and 1984 respectively, while Concourse A was built in 1986 to handle future growth.

In 1987, Piedmont started non-stop 767 flights to London. In the mid-1980s, the old terminal site was converted to a cargo center, and the central concourse and Eastern unit terminal were removed to make way for more cargo buildings. The original main building still stands and is used for office space. The old control tower was removed in the late 1990s. In 1989 Piedmont merged with USAir; the new merged operations kept the USAir name.

1990 to 2013: the influence of US Airways

In 1990, a new  international and commuter concourse (Concourse D) opened, and in 1991 further expansion of the central terminal building continued, reflective of USAir's dominating presence at the airport. A monumental bronze statue of Queen Charlotte of Mecklenburg-Strelitz (the namesake of the city), created by Raymond Kaskey, was placed in front of the main terminal.

In 1990, Lufthansa began Boeing 747 service to Germany; this service ended shortly thereafter. In 1994 British Airways began service to London via a "global alliance" with USAir. This was later discontinued, as British Airways formed the Oneworld Alliance and USAir become a part of the Star Alliance (although USAir later joined Oneworld prior to merging with American). Lufthansa restarted service to Charlotte in 2003 and now operates flights between Charlotte and Munich, utilizing their Airbus A350-900 fleet. Prior to March 31, 2019, Lufthansa flew their Airbus A340-600 and Airbus A330-300 aircraft on the route.

In 1999, plans were announced for the construction of a regional carrier concourse (present-day Concourse E) and for the expansion of Concourses A and D. This expansion was designed by The Wilson Group and LS3P Associates Ltd. In 2002, the new 32-gate Concourse E opened. The airline closed its Concourse D US Airways Club location in 2002. In 2003, the main ticketing hall was expanded to the east, providing 13 additional ticketing counters and a new security checkpoint; Concourse D was expanded by an additional nine gates.

Following the 2005 acquisition of US Airways by America West Airlines in a reverse takeover, Charlotte remained the primary domestic hub for the airline. The majority of US Airways' international routes remained at the airline's second-largest hub, Philadelphia.

Between 2007 and 2015, the airport completed $1.5 billion worth of construction projects, part of which later became known as the "CLT 2015" plan. These projects included a new airport entrance roadway, new hourly parking decks with a centralized rental car facility, a regional intermodal cargo facility, an expansion of the east-side terminal lobby, new checked baggage handling systems, and additional space for concessions and shops.

Construction of the airport's fourth runway began in spring 2007. The new runway lies west of the three existing runways. The construction of the fourth runway required the relocation of parts of Wallace Neel Road (which had been the Western boundary of the airport) to an alignment located farther to the west. Construction occurred in two phases. The first phase, which began in March 2007, included grading and drainage. The second phase included the paving and lighting of the runway. In August 2009, crews paved the last section.

With the merger of US Airways and American Airlines in 2013, Charlotte became the second-largest hub for the merged airline, after Dallas/Fort Worth.

2013–present: post-merger growth and Destination CLT

In 2015, airport officials formally announced the completion of the "CLT 2015" plan, and kicked off construction of the new Destination CLT airport development plan. Destination CLT represents a total $2.5 billion investment into the future growth of the airport.

Concourse A North, a nine-gate expansion of Concourse A, was completed in summer 2018. Air Canada, JetBlue, United, Southwest, Frontier, and Spirit moved their operations to Concourse A North upon its completion. A digital artwork titled "Interconnected," by Refik Anadol, is prominently featured on three massive display screens in Concourse A North. The artwork draws from the airport's data network of aircraft movements and turns the data into an always-changing visual artwork. The main 139-foot-long screen is one of the largest digital artworks of its kind in the world.

In late 2019, the new terminal roadway was opened. The new roadway has sixteen lanes over two levels, with departures traffic using the elevated level and arrivals traffic utilizing the ground level. The eight lanes on each level are split into five outer lanes for personal vehicles, and three inner lanes for commercial and airport vehicles. Some components of the project, namely the skybridges from the hourly parking deck and rental car facility, the glass canopy over the roadway, and some lanes on the departure level will not be finished until the terminal lobby project is complete.

In November 2019, the East Terminal Expansion opened. The expansion added 51,000 square feet, primarily of passenger amenity space, across three levels. The main level of the expansion is "The Plaza," a food court. The Plaza's artistic centerpiece is a hanging artwork entitled "Loops" by Christian Moeller. "Loops" became a part of the project through a partnership between the airport and the Charlotte-Mecklenburg Arts and Science Council. The upper level of the East Terminal Expansion includes a Centurion Lounge.

The airport announced that it had served 50.2 million passengers in 2019, a new record for the airport.

Destination CLT includes a $90 million terminal renovation project of Concourses A, B, C, D, and the Atrium. Aspects of the renovations include the replacement of carpet with terrazzo, upgraded lighting, remodeled bathrooms, and new seats with charging in every seat. Concourse B renovations wrapped up in 2019.

With the conclusion of the terminal roadway and curb front construction, work on the terminal lobby renovation and expansion began. The $600 million project is projected to be completed in 2025. The project will consolidate existing security checkpoints A, B, C, D, and E into three larger and more efficient checkpoints. The baggage claim and ticketing areas will be completely gutted and remodeled. Raymond Kaskey's "Queen Charlotte" statue will be moved to a prominent position within the new "Queen's Court" area in the expanded lobby. After the lobby renovation and expansion is complete, a 146,000-square-foot glass canopy will be constructed over the roadway and pedestrian skybridges and tunnels will be built connecting the terminal to the hourly parking/rental car facility complex.

Separate from the Destination CLT family of projects, the FAA is building a new 367-foot control tower south of the CLT passenger terminal to replace the existing 150-foot tower north of the terminal. When complete, the tower will be the second-tallest air traffic control tower in the United States and the ninth-tallest in the world. The new tower is expected to come into active service in 2022.

Future
Planning is currently underway for the construction of a fourth parallel runway between existing runways 18R/36L and 18C/36C. The runway, projected to cost $422 million, is slated to be 10,000 feet long. Previously, a 12,000-foot runway had been planned; however, the airport reversed course due to practicality and cost considerations.

Future terminal expansions included under the Destination CLT umbrella include Phase II of the Concourse A Expansion, Phase VIII of the Concourse E expansion, and expansions to Concourses B and C. These expansions are projected to cost roughly $1.1 billion and are not expected to be complete until 2026. 8-10 gates are expected to be added to Concourse B, 10-12 gates to Concourse C, and 10 gates in the expansion of Concourse A farther north. Phase VIII of the Concourse E expansion will add 34,000 square feet of hold room to the concourse. This phase of the expansion accommodates gates already in operation; however, passengers must walk under temporary canopies to access the aircraft parked at these gates.

The construction of the CATS LYNX Silver Line, expected to be complete in 2030, will bring light rail service to the airport. The airport plans to construct an automated people mover to connect the terminal to the light rail station, which will be located at the airport's Destination District just north of the terminal.

Facilities

Terminal

CLT has one terminal with 115 gates on five concourses. All five concourses are connected to the central terminal building housing ticketing, security, and baggage claim. All international arrivals without customs pre-clearance are handled in Concourse D.

Concourse A has 21 gates. The main pier serves American and Delta while the Concourse A North extension serves United, Southwest, jetBlue, Spirit, and Air Canada.
Concourse B has 16 gates and serves exclusively American mainline domestic flights.
Concourse C has 18 gates and serves exclusively American mainline domestic flights.
Concourse D has 13 gates and serves American, Lufthansa, and Volaris. All international flights without customs preclearance are handled through Concourse D. 
Concourse E has 46 gates. Concourse E is the home of American Eagle's CLT operation, which is the largest express flight operation of its kind in the world.

American has two Admirals Club locations in Concourses B & C. An American Express Centurion Lounge is located in the Plaza between Concourse D & E.

Runways
CLT currently has four runways.

Ground transportation
The airport terminal is located on Josh Birmingham Parkway, which connects with Wilkinson Boulevard (to I-485 and Uptown Charlotte), Little Rock Road (to I-85) and Billy Graham Parkway (to I-77).

The Charlotte Area Transit System (CATS) operates two bus routes from the airport terminal: Route 5-Airport (Sprinter) to Uptown Charlotte/CTC and Route 60-Tyvola Road to LYNX Tyvola station. There is also bus service to the air cargo center, maintenance facilities, and old terminal via Route 10-West Boulevard to the Charlotte Transportation Center in center city Charlotte. The Lynx Silver Line, planned for completion in 2030, will serve the airport, traveling along a route that largely follows the Sprinter route.

Located in front of the airport terminal, the Rental Car Facility operates on the three lower levels of the Hourly Deck and has a combined 3,000 cars from eight rental car companies. The level 2 lobby includes customer counters and kiosks from the following companies: Advantage, Alamo, Avis, Budget, Dollar, Enterprise, Hertz and National.

Other facilities
Charlotte Douglas International Airport is one of a small number of major "hub" airports in the world that has an aviation museum located on the field. The Carolinas Aviation Museum, established in 1992, has a collection of over 50 aircraft, including a DC-3 that is painted in Piedmont Airlines livery. The museum also has an aviation library with over 9,000 volumes and a very extensive photography collection. Rare aircraft in the collection include one of only two surviving Douglas D-558 Skystreak aircraft and the second (and oldest surviving) U.S.-built Harrier, which was used as the flight-test aircraft and accumulated over 5,000 flight-test hours. In January 2011, the museum acquired N106US, the US Airways Airbus A320 ditched by captain Chesley Sullenberger as US Airways Flight 1549 in the Hudson River on January 15, 2009. This aircraft, which was delivered on June 10, 2011, is about 35 years younger than any other commercial airliner on display in a museum.

Charlotte Douglas International Airport is one of the few airports in the United States with a public viewing area. Here, visitors can watch planes take off, land, and taxi to and from runway 18C/36C in addition to providing a view of concourse A. The Overlook is a popular spot for aviation enthusiasts and plane spotters.

Airlines and destinations

Passenger

Cargo

Statistics

Top destinations

Airline market share

Annual traffic

Accidents and incidents
On May 24, 1950, a Grumman Mallard operated by Ford Motor Company crashed during takeoff, one occupant was killed.
On September 11, 1974, Eastern Air Lines Flight 212 crashed on final approach en route from Charleston, South Carolina. The NTSB determined that the probable cause of the accident was a "lack of altitude awareness" of the pilots at critical points during the approach. Of 82 people on board, only 13 survived the crash and fire; three of those died within a month of the accident.
On October 25, 1986, Piedmont Airlines Flight 467 overran the runway, damaging the airplane beyond repair. Of the 119 people on board, three passengers sustained serious injuries, and three crew members and 28 passengers sustained minor injuries in the incident. There were no fatalities. An NTSB report was released, it concluded that "crew coordination was deficient due to the first officer's failure to call the captain's attention to aspects of the approach that were not in accordance with Piedmont operating procedures."
On January 19, 1988, a Mountain Air Cargo De Havilland Canada DHC-6 Twin Otter 200 (N996SA), on a flight from Erie, Pennsylvania, collided with a tree when attempting to approach the 36L runway. One crew member was seriously injured.
On July 2, 1994, USAir Flight 1016, which originated in Columbia, South Carolina, crashed in a residential area on approach, killing 37. The crash of the DC-9 was attributed to windshear during a thunderstorm.
On December 10, 1997, a Beechcraft King Air, operated by Spitfire Sales and Leasing crashed on approach to runway 36L colliding with trees and the ground, one crewmember was killed.
On January 8, 2003, US Airways Express Flight 5481 crashed on takeoff while en route to Greenville-Spartanburg International Airport, killing all 21 people aboard. The flight was operated by Air Midwest, an independent airline operating under a US Airways Express codesharing agreement.

References

External links

 at North Carolina DOT airport guide

 
Airports established in 1935
Airports in North Carolina
Airport
Transportation in Mecklenburg County, North Carolina
Works Progress Administration in North Carolina
Buildings and structures in Charlotte, North Carolina
1935 establishments in North Carolina